Two Studies of an Actor is the name given to a sheet of drawings in the trois crayons technique by the French Rococo artist Antoine Watteau. Dated between 1716 and 1721, the sheet was once in the collection of Watteau's friend, the manufacturer and publisher Jean de Jullienne; passing through a number of private collectors, it was acquired in 1874 by the Kupferstichkabinett, Berlin, where it remains. 

The sheet consists of two compositional half-length studies of a sitting old man wearing a hat, holding a cane in the left hand; the left figure has the old man shown en face, and the right one respectively has him shown in a three-quarters turn. In scholarship, the sheet is noted as an example of Watteau's approach with multiple treatment of a single figure, compared to these of Anthony van Dyck and Philippe de Champaigne found in their respective portraits of Charles I of England and Cardinal Richelieu.

The identity of the sitter remains somewhat ambiguous among Watteau scholars; two of the artist's contemporaries were thought to be the sitter: the Catholic priest Pierre-Maurice Haranger and the Comédie-Française player Pierre Le Noir, sieur de La Thorillière. Coming from either of these identities, the sheet is related to numerous paintings and drawings by Watteau.

Provenance and dating
In the 18th century, the sheet belonged to Watteau's friend and patron, the manufacturer and publisher Jean de Jullienne; it was said by Edmond de Goncourt that the sheet was lot 787, sold for 82 livres at the sale held after Jullienne's death in Spring 1767, described as "Deux hommes en habit de paysan; ils sont assis, la main gauche de chacun est posée sur une canne en béquille."

After remaining obscure for a century, the sheet resurfaced in the 1870s, passing through numerous private collectors known only by name. By 1871, it was in possession of a certain De Vos; then it passed to another owner, a Rotterdam-based collector D. Vis Blokhuyzen. After Blokhuyzen's death, the sheet was sold as lot 664 at auction on October 23, 1871 to the German entrepreneur Barthold Suermondt (1818–1887); as part of Suermondt's collection, the sheet has been acquired for the Kupferstichkabinett, Berlin, in 1874.

In a 1984 monograph on Watteau, Marianne Roland Michel dates the sheet as earlier as c. 1716–1717, relying on the drawing style. in the 1984–1985 exhibition catalogue, the National Gallery of Art curator Margaret Morgan Grasselli dated the drawings ; in a later 1987 dissertation on Watteau's drawings, she re-attributed the sheet to final months of Watteau's life, c. 1721. In the 1996 catalogue raisonné, Pierre Rosenberg and Louis-Antoine Prat give the sheet an earlier dating of c. 1720.

Related prints
In the 1720s, François Boucher had the sheet engraved in reverse as two separate etchings; the etching after the left figure was published in 1726 as plate 69 in volume one of the Figures de différents caractères, while the etching after the right figure, in which Boucher notably replaced the hat with a skullcap, was respectively published in 1728 as plate 198 in the said anthology's volume two. Boucher's etching of the right figure has been later reproduced by Claude Du Bosc, captioned La Tourilere comédien. Prints after the Berlin sheet were recorded in the 1875 catalogue raisonné of Watteau's art compiled by Edmond de Goncourt; various reissues of Edmond and Jules de Goncourt's anthology L'art du dix-huitième siècle mention "la planche des «Différents caractères» qui passe pour représenter l'acteur La Thorillière," which is likely a reference to Du Bosc's print rather than Boucher's ones. Besides from prints, there is a sheet of sanguine studies in the Louvre that notably features a partial copy after the left figure of the Berlin sheet.

Identity of the sitter
Aside from Goncourt's notes, it is thought that in an 1896 article published in Gazette des Beaux-Arts, the playwright and poet Gaston Schéfer was the first to try and identify the sitter of the drawings, available to him through Boucher's etchings. In a copy of the Figures de différents caractères held by the Bibliothèque de l'Arsenal, Schéfer discovered that the impression of folio 198 has an inscription by eighteenth-century hand, thought to be that of Pierre-Jean Mariette, saying "Portrait de l'abbé Larancher (struck-through) Haranger Chanoine de Saint-Germain-l'Auxerrois, ami de Watteau." From the inscription, Schéfer suggested that while the attire appears to be a theatrical one, the sitter was actually a priest, namely the Abbé Pierre-Maurice Haranger (ca. 1655–1735), canon at the Saint-Germain l'Auxerrois who was one of Watteau's closest friends. It has been stated by Schéfer that to Watteau, it was not a controversial thing to depict a Catholic priest wearing an unusual attire, for it wasn't so to the Church; Schéfer provides a similar example of Charles-Nicolas Cochin who produced a drawing of his priest friend, the Abbé François-Emmanuel Pommyer, wearing a peasant dress. Aware of Du Bosc's print, Schéfer said that the priest's appearance was fine enough to make one confuse him with an actor; it has also been presumed by Schéfer that a study of Haranger, similar to the Berlin sheet, was probably used for the rightmost figure in a painting by Watteau, The Coquettes.

In the 1920s, Schéfer's point was objected by Émile Dacier, Albert Vuaflart and Jacques Herold — the group behind the four-volume study of prints after Watteau's paintings; Dacier, Vuaflart, and Herold suggested that Watteau would hardly had an intention to depict a priest in what the scholars supposed to be a peasant or theatrical dress. In contrary to Schéfer's attribution that was based on a hand-written inscription, they relied on the engraved inscription from Du Bosc's copy after Boucher that claimed the Comédie-Française player Pierre Le Noir, sieur de la Thorillière (1659–1731), to be the sitter. These objections caused a debate among Watteau scholars, noticeably complicated by the lack of surviving and/or authentic portraits of both supposed sitters; part of scholars accepted Schéfer's attribution, while some other authors have adopted Dacier and Vuaflart's one.

Exhibition history

Notes

References

Further reading

External links
 Zwei Portraitstudien des Kanonikers von Saint-Germain l´Auxerrois, Abbé Pierre-Maurice Haranger at museum-digital

Objects of the Berlin State Museums
Drawings by Antoine Watteau
Drawings of people
Portraits of men
18th-century drawings